= Central Finance and Contracts Unit (Turkey) =

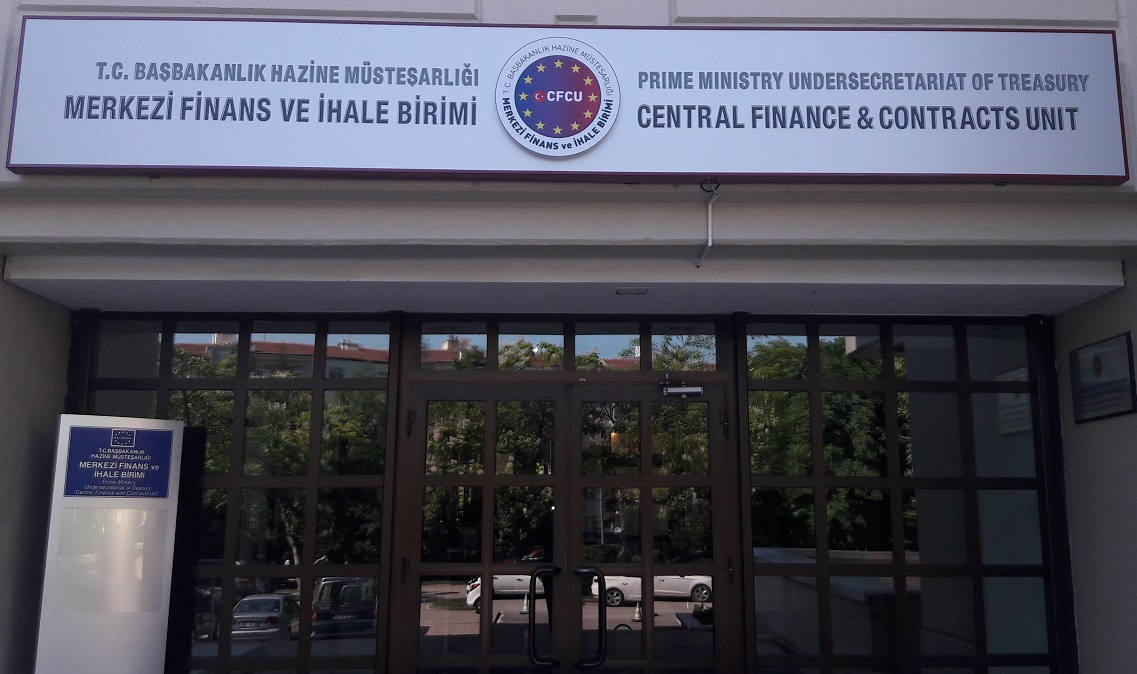
Entrance of Central Finance and Contracts Unit building in Ankara.

The Central Finance and Contracts Unit (CFCU) (Turkish: Merkezî Finans ve İhale Birimi) is a unit within the Ministry of Treasury and Finance of the Republic of Turkey. It was established by a Memorandum of Understanding which is signed between the European Commission and the Republic of Turkey on 14 February 2002 which was subsequently ratified by the Grand National Assembly of Turkey on the 29 January 2003.

The CFCU is taking the responsibility for the overall budgeting, tendering, contracting, payments, accounting and financial reporting aspects of all procurement in the context of the European Union funded programmes in Turkey. As a central unit, the CFCU is operating as an independent body but is attached to the Secretariat General for EU Affairs of Turkey and the National Aid Coordinator of Turkey.

The Central Finance and Contracts Unit is an integral part of the Turkish public administration that will take decisions autonomously under the responsibility of a Programme Authorising Officer (PAO). Although the CFCU is administratively linked (e.g. for logistic support) to the Ministry of Treasury and Finance it is run independently.

The CFCU has the sole responsibility over the overall budgeting, tendering, contracting, payments, accounting and financial reporting aspects of the procurement of services, supplies, works and grants in the context of EU funded programmes in Turkey.

The CFCU ensures that the EU rules, regulations and procedures pertaining to the procurement of services, supplies, works and grants are adhered to and that a proper reporting system is functioning.

The CFCU advises the Senior Programme Officers (SPO) within the Line Ministries on EU external aid implementation procedures (e.g. procurement and contracting procedures), however, full responsibility for technical implementation remains with the SPO.

More specifically the CFCU, acting as the Contracting Authority, is entrusted with the following tasks:

== Tendering ==
1. receiving and reviewing Terms of Reference, Technical Specifications and Works Dossiers prepared by the line ministry
2. preparation of tender information and dossiers
3. managing the short listing process for international restricted service contracts and in exceptional cases for international restricted works tenders
4. despatching or arranging the collection of tender dossiers

== Evaluation ==
1. nominating the composition of the Shortlist Panel and the Tender Evaluation Committee
2. acting as the non-voting chairman and non-voting secretary of the Shortlist Panel and Tender Evaluation Committee
3. managing the evaluation process according to EC rules and procedures. (These rules and procedures are explained in very much detailed in the Practical Guide to contract procedures financed from the General Budget of the European Communities in the context of External Actions (PRAG) and also published on the internet web site of the EC.)
4. preparation of the Shortlist and Evaluation reports

== Contracting ==
1. carrying out contract negotiations, where appropriate
2. drafting, preparation and signature of contracts by the PAO (endorsed by the European Commission) on the basis of the request and technical recommendations of the SPO
3. endorsement of twinning covenants, where appropriate

== Accounting ==
1. establishing and maintaining a project and financial accounting system
2. making records of payments under signed contracts

== Payments ==
1. receiving requests for payment from contractors, checking these are legitimate
2. carrying out payments in accordance with standard EU procedures in force at the time

== Reporting ==
Providing to the National Fund, for distribution to the NAC and EC Representation in Ankara, monthly reports covering the status of projects being implemented and the financial status of each programme
